Anastopoulos is a Greek surname. Notable people with the surname include:

Akim Anastopoulo (born 1960), American TV show judge
Nikos Anastopoulos (born 1958), Greek football striker

Greek-language surnames